Pieter Louw (1725 – 1800) was a Dutch painter-engraver best known for his mezzotint copies of old masters.

Louw was born in Amsterdam and worked with Caspar Jacobsz Philips. He later became a teacher and pupils were Jacob Cats, Anna Maria Ebeling, Johan George Kreetschmer, Daniël Veelwaard (I), and Izaak Jansz. de Wit.

References 

1725 births
1800 deaths
Painters from Amsterdam
Dutch painters